In music, Op. 142 stands for Opus number 142. Compositions that are assigned this number include:

 Schubert – Four Impromptus, D. 935
 Schumann – 4 Gesänge
 Shostakovich – String Quartet No. 14